Natural Albania is a nationalist political party in Albania created in 2010 by Koço Danaj. The main objective of the party is to propose a pacific solution to establish Greater Albania. The idea of unification has roots in the events of the Treaty of London in 1913, when roughly half of the predominantly Albanian territories and 40% of the population were left outside the new country's border.

External links
Politics of Albania
Elections in Albania

References

Albanian nationalist parties
Political parties in Albania
Albanian irredentism
Political parties established in 2010
2010 establishments in Albania
Nationalist parties in Europe